VfB Lübeck is a German professional football team formed in 1919. Throughout its history the club's first team has competed in various national and international competitions. All players who have played in 50 or more such matches are listed below.

Key
Players with name in bold currently play for the club.
Years are the first and last calendar years in which the player appeared in competitive first-team football for the club.
League appearances and goals comprise those in the Bundesliga, 2. Bundesliga, 3. Liga and the Regionalliga.
Total appearances and goals comprise those in the Bundesliga, 2. Bundesliga, 3. Liga, Regionalliga, DFB-Pokal, and several now-defunct competitions.

Players with 50 or more appearances
Appearances and goals are for first-team competitive matches only. Substitute appearances are included. Statistics are correct as of 1 January 2011.

Position key:
GK – Goalkeeper; 
DF – Defender;
MF – Midfielder;
FW – Forward

References
General
Germany – Player Data – VfB Lübeck at RSSSF.
Fussballdaten – Die Fussball-Databank

Specific

 
Lubeck
Association football player non-biographical articles